Anchomanes is a genus of flowering plants in the family Araceae. The genus is native to tropical Africa.

Anchomanes is quite similar to species in the genera Dracontium and Amorphophallus, but there are a few apparent differences. One such difference is that the roots are perennial. Also, the stalks are spiny and the tuberous rhizomes have eyes.

Species
Anchomanes abbreviatus Engl. - Kenya, Tanzania, Mozambique
Anchomanes boehmii Engl. - Kigoma region of western Tanzania
Anchomanes dalzielii N.E.Br. - Benin, Ghana, Ivory Coast, Nigeria, Cameroon, Sudan, Zambia, Zimbabwe 
Anchomanes difformis (Blume) Engl. - much of tropical Africa from Liberia to Tanzania, south to Angola and Zambia
Anchomanes giganteus Engl. - Gabon, Congo-Brazzaville, Zaire, Burundi
Anchomanes nigritianus Rendle - Gabon, Nigeria

References

Aroideae
Araceae genera
Flora of Africa